Farrukh Shehzad (born 12 October 1984) is a Pakistani cricketer. He played in 28 first-class, 25 List A, and 32 Twenty20 matches between 2002 and 2015.

References

External links
 

1984 births
Living people
Pakistani cricketers
Faisalabad cricketers
Place of birth missing (living people)